Pierre-Paul Renders (born 17 July 1963) is a Belgian film director and screenwriter. He has directed three films since 1992. His 2006 film Mr. Average was entered into the 28th Moscow International Film Festival.

Selected filmography
 Thomas est amoureux (2001)
 Mr. Average (2006)

References

External links

1953 births
Living people
Belgian film directors
Belgian screenwriters
Mass media people from Brussels